Metula  is a genus of sea snails,  marine gastropod molluscs in the family Colubrariidae.

Fossil records
This genus is known in the fossil records from the Paleocene to the Quaternary (age range: from 61.7 to 0.781 million years ago).

Species
Species in the genus Metula  include:

 Metula aegrota (Reeve, 1845)
 Metula africana Bouchet, 1988
 Metula agaoensis S.-I Huang & M.-H. Lin, 2019
 Metula amosi Vanatta, 1913
 Metula andamanica Smith, 1906
 Metula angioyorum Parth, 1992
 Metula bozzettii Parth, 1990
 Metula crosnieri Bouchet, 1988
 Metula cumingi A. Adams, 1853
 Metula daphnelloides Melville & Standen, 1903
 Metula ellena Olsson & Bayer, 1972
 Metula elongata Dall, 1907
 Metula etelvinae Bozzetti, 2001
 Metula eureka S.-I Huang & M.-H. Lin, 2019
 Metula frausseni Bozzetti, 1995
 Metula gigliottii Coltro, 2005
 Metula inflata (Houbrick, 1984)
 Metula kilburni Parth, 1994
 Metula knudseni Kilburn, 1975
 Metula lintea Guppy, 1882
 Metula metula (Hinds, 1844)
 Metula metulina (Kuroda & Habe in Kuroda, Habe & Oyama, 1971)
 Metula minor Olsson & Bayer, 1972
 Metula mitrella (A. Adams & Reeve, 1850)
 Metula mozambicana S.-I Huang & M.-H. Lin, 2019
 Metula olssoni Woodring, 1928
 Metula optima Olsson & Bayer, 1972
 Metula parthi Bondarev, 1997
 Metula reticularis Traub, 1938
 Metula sulcata S.-Q. Zhang, J.-L. Zhang & S.-P. Zhang, 2016
 Metula thachi Fraussen & S.-I. Huang, 2011
 Metula tumida Xiutong & Suping, 2000

 Species brought into synonymy
 Metula agassizi Clench & Aguayo, 1941: synonym of Bartschia agassizi (Clench & Aguayo, 1941) (original combination)
 Metula anfractura Matthews & Rios, 1968: synonym of Bartschia agassizi (Clench & Aguayo, 1941)
 Metula boswellae Kilburn, 1975: synonym of Kanamarua boswellae (Kilburn, 1975) (original combination)
 Metula canetae (Clench & Aguayo, 1944): synonym of Gaillea canetae (Clench & Aguayo, 1944)
 Metula chetyzecchiae Bozzetti, 1992: synonym of Metula metulina (Kuroda & Habe, 1971)
 Metula clathrata (A. Adams & Reeve, 1850): synonym of Metula knudseni Kilburn, 1975 (based on junior primary homonym)
 Metula clathrata Knudsen, 1956: synonym of Metula africana Bouchet, 1988 (secondary homonym of M. clathrata (Adams & Reeve, 1850))
 Metula fusiformis Clench & Aguayo, 1941: synonym of Manaria fusiformis (Clench & Aguayo, 1941) (original combination)
 Metula guppyi Olsson & Bayer, 1972: synonym of Bartschia guppyi (Olsson & Bayer, 1972) (original combination)
 Metula hindsii H. Adams & A. Adams, 1858: synonym of Metula metula (Hinds, 1844) (unnecessary substitute name for Buccinum metula, established to avoid tautonymy)
 Metula rehderi (Kilburn, 1977): synonym of Kanamarua hyatinthus Shikama, 1973
 Metula significans (Rehder, 1943) : synonym of  Bartschia significans Rehder, 1943
 Metula somalica Bozzetti, 1993: synonym of Kanamarua somalica (Bozzetti, 1993) (original combination)
 Metula vicdani Kosuge, 1989: synonym of Kanamarua hyatinthus Shikama, 1973

References

 Beu A.G. & Maxwell P.A. (1987) A revision of the fossil and living gastropods related to Plesiotriton Fischer, 1884 (Family Cancellariidae, Subfamily Plesiotritoninae n. subfam.). With an appendix: Genera of Buccinidae Pisaniinae related to Colubraria Schumacher, 1817. New Zealand Geological Survey Paleontological Bulletin 54:1-140
  Spencer, H.G., Marshall, B.A. & Willan, R.C. (2009). Checklist of New Zealand living Mollusca. pp 196–219. in: Gordon, D.P. (ed.) New Zealand inventory of biodiversity. Volume one. Kingdom Animalia: Radiata, Lophotrochozoa, Deuterostomia. Canterbury University Press, Christchurch.
 Kilburn R.N. (2004) The identities of Otitoma and Antimitra (Mollusca: Gastropoda: Conidae and Buccinidae). African Invertebrates 45: 263–270. NIZT 682
page(s): 269

Gastropod genera
Colubrariidae